Maria Kaniewska (27 May 1911 in Kiev - 11 December 2005 in Warsaw) was a Polish actress, screenplay writer, film director.

She debuted on 14 October 1933 in the Toruń City Theater after graduating from the Acting Department of State Institute of Theatrical Arts in Warsaw. In 1948 Kaniewska finished her study at the National Film School in Łódź as a movie director and was offered a job there as well. In 1960 she received a bronze lion award at the Venice Film Festival.

Selected filmography
Actress
 The Last Stage (1947)
 Warsaw Premiere (1951)
 Bad Luck (1960)
 Pięciu (1964)

Director
 Niedaleko Warszawy (Not far from Warsaw) (1954)
 Awantura o Basię (Argument about Basia) (1959)
 Szatan z siódmej klasy (Satan from the seventh grade) (1960)
 Komedianty (Comedians)  (1961)
 Panienka z okienka (Lady in a window)  (1964)
 Bicz Boży  (1966)
 Pierścień księżnej Anny (Ring of Princess Anna) (1970).
 Zaczarowane podwórko (Enchanted yard) (1974)

References

External links

1911 births
2005 deaths
Polish film directors
Polish women film directors
Actors from Kyiv
Polish women dramatists and playwrights
20th-century Polish actresses
20th-century Polish dramatists and playwrights
20th-century Polish women writers
Film people from Kyiv